"In God We Trust" (also rendered as "In God we trust") is the official motto of the United States as well as the motto of the U.S. state of Florida. It was adopted by the U.S. Congress in 1956, replacing  ("Out of many, one"), which had been the de facto motto since the initial design of the Great Seal of the United States.

While the earliest mentions of the phrase can be found in the mid-19th century, the origins of this phrase as a political motto lie in the American Civil War, where Union supporters wanted to emphasize their attachment to God and to boost morale. The capitalized form "IN GOD WE TRUST" first appeared on the two-cent piece in 1864; it was not printed on paper currency until 1957 and on some postage stamps until 1954. A law passed in July 1955 by a joint resolution of the 84th Congress and approved by President Dwight Eisenhower requires that "In God We Trust" appear on all American currency. Two years later, the phrase was used on paper money for the first time — on the updated one-dollar silver certificate that entered circulation on October 1, 1957. The 84th Congress later passed legislation, also signed by President Eisenhower on July 30, 1956, declaring the phrase to be the national motto. Several states have also mandated or authorized its use in public institutions or schools; while Florida, Georgia and Mississippi have incorporated the phrase in some of their state symbols. The motto has also been used in some cases in other countries, most notably on Nicaragua's coins. 

The motto remains popular among the American public. According to a 2003 joint poll by USA Today, CNN, and Gallup, 90% of Americans support the inscription "In God We Trust" on U.S. coins; and a 2019 student poll by College Pulse showed that 53% of students supported its inclusion in currency. Some groups and people in the United States, however, have objected to its use, contending that its religious reference violates the Establishment Clause of the First Amendment. These groups believe the phrase should be removed from currency and public property, which has resulted in numerous lawsuits. This argument has not overcome the interpretational doctrine of accommodationism, which allows the government to endorse religious establishments as long as they are all treated equally, and that of "ceremonial deism", which states that a repetitious invocation of a religious entity in ceremonial matters strips the phrase of its original religious connotation. The New Hampshire Supreme Court, as well as the Second, Fourth, Sixth, Eighth, Ninth, and Tenth Circuits, have all upheld the constitutionality of the motto in various settings. The Supreme Court has discussed the motto in footnotes but has never directly ruled on its compliance with the U.S. constitution.

Origins 
The earliest recorded usage of the motto in English was in January 1748, when The Pennsylvania Gazette reported on the colours of Associators regiments, namely that of Benjamin Franklin's Pennsylvania militia, one of which said: "IX. A Coronet and Plume of Feathers. Motto, ."

The precise phrase, “In God We Trust” is also found in a publication of Isaac Watts’ Psalter which was revised and printed in America in 1785. Watts had translated Psalm 115:9-11 with the words, “Britain, trust the Lord.” An American publisher, Joel Barlow, sought to revise Watts’ Psalter for an American audience. Barlow's goal was to modify Watts in such a way as to purge the un-American flavor. Barlow simply translated Psalm 115: 9–11 with the words “In God we Trust.”There were several other unrelated recordings of the motto. It can be encountered in some literary works of the early 19th century. One of them, "Defence of Fort M'Henry", contained a version of the motto and subsequently became the national anthem of the United States. It also appeared in 1845, when D.S. Whitney published an anti-slavery hymn in The Liberator. Odd Fellows have also used the phrase as their motto from the 1840s at least into the 1870s.

Motto on U.S. currency

Initial adoption 
In a letter dated November 13, 1861, Rev. Mark R. Watkinson of Ridleyville, Pennsylvania (pastor of the Prospect Hill Baptist Church in present-day Prospect Park, Pennsylvania), petitioned the Treasury Department to add a statement recognizing "Almighty God in some form on our coins" in order to "relieve us from the ignominy of heathenism". At least part of the motivation was to declare that God was on the Union side of the Civil War, given that the Confederacy's constitution, unlike the Union's, invoked God. This sentiment was shared by other citizens who supported such inclusion in their letters. Indeed, the 125th Pennsylvania Infantry for the Union Army assumed the motto "In God we trust" in early August 1862.

In the South, the phrase has also gained significant traction. A Confederate bunting with “In God We Trust” printed in the center, dated to late 1861 or early 1862 and attributed to the 37th Arkansas Infantry Regiment, was probably captured by the 33rd Iowa Infantry Regiment at the Battle of Helena and is currently in possession of the Iowa Historical Society. Another flag with exactly the same motto, this time of the 60th Tennessee Infantry Regiment, was captured in the course of the Battle of Big Black River Bridge. Additionally, in 1864, Harper's Weekly reported that the Union Navy had captured a flag whose motto said: "Our cause is just, our duty we know; In God we trust, to battle we go." Other Confederate symbols included close paraphrasing of the motto, such as the banner of the Apalachicola Guard of Florida (In God is our trust) and "The Star-Spangled Cross and the Pure Field of White", a popular song in the Southern military whose refrain contains the following passage: "Our trust is in God, who can help us in fight, And defend those who ask Him in prayer."

President Abraham Lincoln's Treasury Secretary, Salmon P. Chase, a lifelong evangelical Episcopalian who was known for his public shows of piety, acted swiftly on the proposal to include a motto referring to God and directed the then-Philadelphia Director of the Mint and member of the National Reform Association, James Pollock, to begin drawing up possible designs that would include the religious phrase. Chase chose his favorite designs and presented a proposal to the Congress for the new designs in late 1863. He then decided on the final version of the new motto, "In God We Trust," in December 1863. Walter H. Breen, a numismatist, wrote that Chase drew inspiration from the motto of Brown University of Providence, Rhode Island, In Deo speramus, which is Latin for a similarly sounding "In God we hope". Lincoln's degree of involvement in the process of the motto's approval was unclear, though he was aware of such talks.

As Chase was preparing his recommendation to Congress, it was found that the federal legislature passed a bill on January 18, 1837, which determined the mottos and devices that should be stamped on U.S. coins. This meant that enactment of some additional legislation was necessary before "In God We Trust" could be engraved. Such bill was introduced and passed as the Coinage Act of 1864 on April 22, 1864, allowing the Secretary of the Treasury to authorize the inclusion of the phrase on one-cent and two-cent coins.

On March 3, 1865, the U.S. Congress passed a bill, which Lincoln subsequently signed as the last act of Congress prior to his assassination, that allowed the Mint Director to place "In God We Trust" on all gold and silver coins that "shall admit the inscription thereon", subject to the Secretary's approval. In 1873, Congress passed another Coinage Act, granting the Secretary of the Treasury the right to "cause the motto IN GOD WE TRUST to be inscribed on such coins as shall admit of such motto".

In God We Trust (or, rarely, its variation, God We Trust) first appeared on 2¢ coins, which were first minted in 1863 and went into mass circulation the following year. According to David W. Lange, a numismatist, the inclusion of the motto on a coin was a major driver for the popularisation of the slogan. Other coins, that is, nickels, quarter dollars, half dollars, half eagles and eagles, have had In God We Trust engraved from 1866 on. Dollar coins got the motto in 1873 for trade dollars and 1878 for common circulation Morgan dollars. However, there was no obligation for the motto to be used, so some denominations still didn't have it. Others, such as nickels, have seen the phrase disappear after a redesign, so that by the late 19th century, most of the coins did not bear the motto. Finally, in 1892, an oversight during the amendment of the Coinage Act struck out the language that mandated inclusion of the phrase.

Banknotes did not have formal authorization, or mandate, to have "In God We Trust" engraved until 1955. However, a version of the motto (In God Is Our Trust) first made a brief appearance on the obverse side of the 1864 $20 interest-bearing and compound interest treasury notes, along with the motto "God and our Right".

Reactions 
The initial reactions of the general populace was far from unanimous approval. On the one hand, Christian newspapers were generally happy with the phrase being included in coins, though some advocated for more religiously connotated mottos, such as "In God alone is our trust" or "God our Christ". On the other, non-religious press was less impressed by the developments. The New York Times editorial board asked to "let us try to carry our religion—such as it is—in our hearts, and not in our pockets" and criticized the Mint for including the motto only on golden and larger silver coins. New York Illustrated News ridiculed the new coins for marking "the first time that God has ever been recognized on any of our counters of Mammon," with a similar comparison made by the Detroit Free Press. The different opinions on its inclusion eventually grew into a dispute between secularists and faith congregations. Others still started to make jokes of "In God We Trust". The American Journal of Numismatics suggested that people would misread the motto as "In Gold we Trust", which they said was "much nearer the fact". Newspapers also started reporting on puns made of the slogan. Already in 1860s, newspapers reported signs reading "In God we Trust — terms cash," "In God we trust. All others are expected to pay cash" and the like.

The phrase, however, gradually became a symbol of national pride. Just six years after it first appeared on coins, the San Francisco Chronicle called it "our nation's motto"; similarly, groups as diverse as prohibitionists and suffragists, pacifists and nativists, Democrats and Republicans, Christians and Jews all adopted the motto or endorsed its usage by the end of the 19th century. The motto stayed popular even as fewer denominations had "In God We Trust" embossed on coins.

1907 Saint-Gaudens coins controversy 
In 1904, President Theodore Roosevelt sought to beautify American coinage and decided to give the task to his friend, Augustus Saint-Gaudens, who, after several delays and technical issues with his design, produced a new design for eagles and double eagles. Roosevelt specifically instructed Saint-Gaudens not to include "In God We Trust" on the coins, as the President feared that these coins would be used to further ungodly activities, such as gambling, and facilitate crime. Saint-Gaudens did not oppose the order, as he thought that the phrase would distract from the coin's design features.
The coin, whose ultra-high relief version is now considered one of the most beautiful coins ever struck in the U.S., was indeed appreciated for its esthetics by art critics. However, a scandal immediately erupted over the lack of "In God We Trust" on the eagles and double eagles. Theodore Roosevelt insisted that while he was in favor of placing the motto on public buildings and monuments, doing so for money (or postage stamps and advertisements) would be "dangerously close to sacrilege":

Press response was largely negative. Most news outlets affiliated with Christian organisations, as well as The Wall Street Journal, The Philadelphia Press and other newspapers were critical of the decision, with accusations amounting to the President being guilty of premeditated assault on religion and disregard for Americans' religious sentiments. Atlanta Constitution wrote that people were to choose between "God and Roosevelt", while The New York Sun published a poem mocking Roosevelt's attitude. In contrast, The New York Times, Chicago Tribune, and some religious newspapers such as The Churchman, sided with the President, who was both stunned and irritated by people's opposition to excluding the motto. This prompted debate in Congress, which quickly decided to reinstate the motto on the coins in an act adopted in 1908. As a result of controversy, relevant design changes were subsequently introduced by the Mint Chief Engraver, Charles E. Barber.

Other coins have also retained or renewed the usage of the motto. All gold coins and silver $1 coins, half dollars and quarters have had the motto engraved since July 1, 1908; pennies followed in 1909 and dimes in 1916. Since 1938, all U.S. coins have borne the "In God We Trust" inscription on them.

Road to the universal mandate 

It is generally thought that during the Cold War era, the government of the United States sought to distinguish itself from the Soviet Union, which promoted state atheism and thus implemented antireligious legislation, therefore, a debate for further usage of religious motto was started in Congress. However, Kevin M. Kruse argues in his book that the opposition of the conservatives against the New Deal, and their subsequent successful campaigns to expand the influence of religion, were the main factors that contributed to further adoption of "In God We Trust".

The Eisenhower administration struck a deeply religious tone, which proved a fertile ground for lobbying for inclusion of the motto in further usages, often attributed to the influence of Billy Graham, a prominent evangelist of the time. After intense public pressure for inclusion of the national motto, it appeared for the first time on some postage stamps of the 1954 Liberty Issue, though lobbying for universal inclusion by Michigan Senator Charles E. Potter and Representative Louis C. Rabaut failed.

The following year, Democratic Representative Charles Edward Bennett of Florida cited the Cold War when he introduced  619, which obliged "In God we trust" to be printed on all banknotes and struck on all coins, in the House, arguing that "[in] these days when imperialistic and materialistic communism seeks to attack and destroy freedom, we should continually look for ways to strengthen the foundations of our freedom". The American Numismatic Association and the American Legion concurred and made resolutions urging to promote further usage of "In God We Trust".

On July 11, 1955, the bill, having passed with bipartisan support of both chambers of Congress, was signed into law by President Eisenhower. Since all coins already complied with the law, the only changes were made to the paper currency. The motto first appeared on the $1 silver certificate in 1957, followed by other certificates. Federal Reserve Notes and United States Notes were circulated with the motto starting from 1964 to 1966, depending on the denomination.

Adoption and display by government institutions in U.S.

Federal government 
On July 30, 1956, the 84th Congress passed a joint resolution "declaring 'IN GOD WE TRUST' the national motto of the United States." The resolution passed both the House and the Senate unanimously and without debate. It replaced , which had existed before as a de facto official motto. The resolution was reaffirmed in 2006, on the 50th anniversary of its adoption, by the Senate, and in 2011 by the House of Representatives, in a 396 to 9 vote. In 2000, the House additionally encouraged to publicly display the motto.

The House of Representatives features the motto above the rostrum of the Speaker, which was carved in the wall in December 1962.

State and local governments

Adoption of the national motto in state symbols 
Three states have adopted "In God We Trust" as part of official symbolics of the state.

In Florida,  1145 provided for the adoption of "In God We Trust" as the official state motto, instead of fairly similar "In God Is Our Trust", effective July 1, 2006. The motto has also appeared on the seal of Florida and on the flag of Florida, as the seal is one of its elements, since 1868.

Georgia's flag features the motto since 2001, which was retained after a redesign two years later.

In Mississippi, the Mississippi Senate voted to add the words, "In God We Trust" to the state seal, justifying it as an effort to protect religious freedom. The change was made effective on July 1, 2014. Six years later, Mississippi Governor Tate Reeves signed into law a bill requiring that the state's flag, which had contained the Confederate battle emblem, be replaced with a new one containing the phrase "In God We Trust." A new flag containing the motto was approved by voters in a referendum, and it became the official state flag in January 2021.

Mandating display 
 Arkansas: In March 2017, Act 911, sponsored by state Representative Jim Dotson, made it a requirement of Arkansas state law for public schools to display posters with the national motto, if these were donated. In 2019, the law was later amended to require public display of the national motto in public schools, higher education institutions and state government buildings, if funds are available for that purpose.
 Florida: In early 2018, Kimberly Daniels, a Democrat who served as a representative for the Florida House of Representatives, introduced  839, a bill that requires public schools to display the motto "In God We Trust" in a conspicuous place. On February 21, 2018, the bill passed 97 to 10 in the House. Governor Rick Scott then signed the mandate into law.
 Idaho: House Concurrent Resolution 32, adopted in March 2020, mandates that the national motto be placed over the chairs of presiding officers of both chambers of Idaho Legislature.
 Kentucky: In 2014, a law was passed that obliged display of the national motto in legislative buildings and in committees. In June 2019, a bill sponsored by state Representative Brandon Reed of Hodgenville was passed that required Kentucky public schools to display the motto "in a prominent location", beginning from the 2019–20 school year. To protest the requirement, Fayette County Public Schools, a school district which serves Lexington, complied by posting framed one-dollar bills, which bear the slogan, while in LaRue County, of which Hodgenville is seat, schools were using oversized images of pennies.
 Louisiana: A bill requiring public display of the motto in public schools was introduced by state Senator Regina Ashford Barrow in March 2018. It was passed unanimously both in the Senate (33 to 0) and in the House (93 to 0). It was signed into law by Governor John Bel Edwards in May that year. The bill also mandated school instruction about "In God We Trust" as part of the social studies curriculum.
 Mississippi: In March 2001, Governor of Mississippi Ronnie Musgrove signed legislation requiring the motto "In God We Trust" to be displayed in every public school classroom, as well as the school auditoriums and cafeterias, throughout the state.
 Ohio: Ohio requires public schools to hang material featuring the motto if school districts receive it as donation, or if money is donated with the stated purpose of buying such materials.
 South Dakota: In March 2019, South Dakota required public schools to prominently display "In God We Trust" motto on their walls, starting from the 2019–20 school year.
 Tennessee: In March 2018, a bill sponsored by state Representative Susan Lynn, which requires Tennessee schools to prominently display "In God We Trust" passed the state House with 81 of the 99 members voting in favor of it. After being approved unanimously in the Senate, it was signed by Governor Bill Haslam into law the following month.
Texas: Texas allowed display of the motto in public schools and higher education institutions since 2003. A 2021 Senate bill to mandate donated copies of the motto to be hung in a "conspicuous place" has passed the Texas House of Representatives on May 25, 2021. It was signed by the Governor on June 16 that year.
 Virginia: A regulation that obliges all Virginia schools to publicly display the motto was signed into law in May 2002.
 Utah: Utah's law to oblige schools to publicly display "In God We Trust" was signed into law in March 2002 by Governor Mike Leavitt. The law also mandates school instruction about the motto.

Allowing display 

 Alabama: A 2018 law allows display of the motto in schools, libraries, government buildings, and on law enforcement vehicles.
 Arizona: Arizona allows public display of the motto in public schools.
 Georgia: Georgia allows for usage of the national motto in schools and government buildings, provided they have funds for pay for its display.
 Indiana: Indiana allows display of the national motto in public schools since 2005.
 Michigan: Michigan allows and encourages the display of the motto in and on public schools as well as state and local government buildings.
New Hampshire:  69, introduced in April 2021, initially proposed to require schools to display the national and state motto's, and passed the House 204–169. It was amended in the Senate to allow publication of the mottos and approved on May 13, 2021, which was approved by the House the following month. The bill was signed into law by Governor Chris Sununu on July 30, 2021.
 North Dakota: North Dakota statute allows display of the national motto in public schools.
 Oklahoma: A bill was passed in 2004 that allowed public schools to display "In God We Trust" and E pluribus unum in classrooms, auditoriums and cafeterias; a 2018 Senate bill to mandate such display died in the House.
 South Carolina: South Carolina allows political subdivisions and schools to post a display detailing the foundations of the American law and government, of which the national motto is one of thirteen documents, while providing context to these documents in terms detailed by the state statute.

In addition to that, several local governments have introduced the display of the motto in government buildings and municipal cars. School boards have also seen voluntary introduction of the motto, particularly after the September 11 attacks, when the American Family Association supplied several 11-by-14-inch posters to school systems and vowed to defend any legal challenges to their display.

Society and culture

Multiple scholars have noted that "In God We Trust" motto is one of the main elements of civil religion in the United States.

Religion
According to Philip Jenkins, a historian of religion, some Bible translations rendered Psalm 56:11 as "In God I trust; I will not fear", which could lead to substitution of the first "I" for "we".

In Islam the word for the concept of reliance on God is called ; the phrase "In God We Trust" is closely paraphrased in two places of the Quran, in surah 10 Yunus, as well as surah Al-A'raf (7:89), and several other verses reinforce this concept. Melkote Ramaswamy, a Hindu American scholar, writes that the presence of the phrase "In God We Trust" on American currency is a reminder that "there is God everywhere, whether we are conscious or not."

License plates

As of May 25, 2021, the following U.S. states currently offer an "In God We Trust" license plate (vanity and standard issues): Alaska, Arizona, Arkansas, Florida, Georgia, Indiana, Kansas, Kentucky, Louisiana, North Carolina, Ohio, Oklahoma, Pennsylvania, South Carolina, Tennessee, Texas, Utah, Virginia, West Virginia, and Wisconsin.

Among the states that use the motto in standard issues, the Mississippi's current standard plate features the motto as displayed on its state seal, while Utah offers a standard option license plate. Florida, which also offers a specialty plate, has an option to place "In God We Trust" instead of the official nickname or county name; Georgia also provides for such an option, while North Carolina offers an option with North Carolina's state motto and "In God We Trust" instead of "First in Flight" or "First in Freedom". In Tennessee, the 2022 issue license plates will include the national motto if the license plate applicant asks to include it.

Opinion polls 
According to a 2003 joint poll by USA Today, CNN, and Gallup, 90% of Americans support the inscription "In God We Trust" on U.S. coins. MSNBC launched a similar live survey online that ran for several years in the late 2000s and yielded overwhelming opposition to the removal of the motto. However, a more recent student poll in 2019 by College Pulse made for The College Fix showed that just over a half of students supports inclusion of the national motto in currency, with two-thirds of those who recognised themselves as Democrats opposing and 94% of Republicans in favor of the measure.

Controversy
"In God We Trust" has long been controversial as an official motto due to what opponents perceive as being a religious statement, and as such, violating the separation of church and state. Secular and atheist organisations, such as Americans United for Separation of Church and State, Freedom From Religion Foundation, as well as The Satanic Temple members, have all opposed inclusion of such motto. On the other hand, Project Blitz as well as conservative organisations and lawmakers have lobbied for its further adoption.

Proponents have extensively argued for inclusion of the national motto in more settings, grounding it in the traditional invocations of God that they say have now become an element of a civil religion and should express the will of the founders, who believed in God. Opponents, on the other hand, argue that not only does the motto violate the secular character of the United States, but it also predefines the type and number of gods (if any) to be trusted, with some taking their arguments to the courts.

Litigation 
The constitutionality of the phrase "In God We Trust" has been repeatedly upheld according to the judicial interpretation of accommodationism, whose adherents state that this entrenched practice has not historically presented any constitutional difficulty, is not coercive, and does not prefer one religious denomination over another. In Zorach v. Clauson (1952), the Supreme Court also wrote that the nation's "institutions presuppose a Supreme Being" and that government recognition of God does not constitute the establishment of a state church as the U.S. constitution's authors intended to prohibit. The courts also rely on the notion of "ceremonial deism" (as defined in Brennan's dissent in Lynch v. Donnelly, 1984), i.e. that there exist religious references that, through their repetitious and customary usage, have become secular and are thus constitutional. While opponents of such rulings argue that Jefferson's notion of "wall of separation between church and state" prohibits any aid, direct or indirect, to any religious institution, and therefore any ruling to the contrary goes counter to Founders' intent, this separationist view has not gained significant ground in judicial settings.

Even though not directly related to the motto, Engel v. Vitale (1962) elicited much speculation on the future of "In God We Trust" in public settings. In the ruling, the U.S. Supreme Court struck down a New York law that encouraged public schools to recite a prayer as written in state law on First Amendment grounds. The ruling sparked widespread outrage and was extremely unpopular at the time, even as the judges' decision was near-unanimous. Almost 4/5 of Americans disapproved of the ruling, according to a Gallup poll. Congressmen were afraid that "In God We Trust" would have to disappear from coins and banknotes, the feeling shared by the then president of the American Bar Association, John C. Salterfield. Senator Sam Ervin, a Democrat from North Carolina, went so far as to wonder if God was declared unconstitutional by that decision. Congressmen tried to direct federal funds to buy Bibles for the Supreme Court justices and to propose a constitutional amendment allowing school prayer (both measures failed). A similar ruling the following year in Abington Township v. Schempp prompted senators to attempt to force the Supreme Court to hang the national motto in the courtroom, which also did not succeed.

Even though the Supreme Court has never ruled directly on the constitutionality of "In God We Trust", several appellate federal courts and some state courts have, and the Supreme Court itself did not seem to have any problem with the phrase being inscribed on coins and banknotes.

Aronow v. United States (1970) was the first case to challenge the inclusion of "In God We Trust" on U.S. currency. The passage of the statute that the lawsuit challenged ("the inscription 'In God we Trust'...shall appear on all United States currency and coins") stood, and the Ninth Circuit stated that: "its [motto's] use is of patriotic or ceremonial character and bears no true resemblance to a governmental sponsorship of a religious exercise". In O'Hair v. Blumenthal (1978), the U.S. District Court for the Western District of Texas also upheld the law. A similar decision was reached on appeal to the Fifth Circuit in 1979, which affirmed that the "primary purpose of the slogan was secular". The same decision was reached in Gaylor v. United States (1996) when it was appealed to the Tenth Circuit.

A series of lawsuits attempting to outlaw "In God We Trust" was filed, with support of the Freedom From Religion Foundation, by Michael Newdow, who was known for his previous case Elk Grove Unified School District v. Newdow (2004), in which the Ninth Circuit issued a ruling removing "under God" from the Pledge of Allegiance (the ruling was overturned by the U.S. Supreme Court). A federal judge in California rejected his reasoning in a June 2006 ruling, and the same conclusion was reached by the Ninth Circuit. Because the Supreme Court denied certiorari, the appellate court's decision, which said that "the national motto is of a "patriotic or ceremonial character," has no "theological or ritualistic impact," and does not constitute "governmental sponsorship of a religious exercise,"" remained unchanged and in force. A lawsuit filed by Newdow and Freedom from Religion Foundation in 2013 in New York also failed, both on trial and on appeal to the Second Circuit; yet another one, filed in Ohio in 2016, was dismissed by the U.S. District Court for the Northern District of Ohio and the Sixth Circuit. The same happened with the lawsuit in the Eighth Circuit, which was unrelated to Newdow's efforts.

In 2015, David F. Bauman, a New Jersey state judge, dismissed a case against the Matawan-Aberdeen Regional School District brought by a student of the district and the American Humanist Association that argued that the phrase "under God" in the Pledge of Allegiance created a climate of discrimination because it promoted religion, making non-believers "second-class citizens". Bauman noted that "as a matter of historical tradition, the words 'under God' can no more be expunged from the national consciousness than the words 'In God We Trust' from every coin in the land, than the words 'so help me God' from every presidential oath since 1789, or than the prayer that has opened every congressional session of legislative business since 1787."

Additionally, several courts have agreed that "In God We Trust" on public buildings did not violate the Establishment Clause: the New Hampshire Supreme Court (1967) and the Fourth Circuit (2005) did so for public schools, with the same appellate federal court arguing the same for a county government office (2005).

While efforts to remove "In God We Trust" were largely fruitless, in Wooley v. Maynard (1977), the Supreme Court struck down a New Hampshire law mandating that every person carry the state motto on their license plates, noting that the state can't force its citizens to "use their private property as a 'mobile billboard' for the State's ideological message". In obiter dicta, the majority agreed that this lawsuit should not be interpreted as a basis for challenging the constitutionality of the motto on U.S. currency, which they argued was not something that was either associated directly with the owner or made to display. Whether it is legal for Mississippi to issue standard license plates that display the national motto as it appears on the state seal (see above) and force drivers objecting to the invocation of God to pay for removing the reference is now being decided in a case in federal court, Griggs v. Graham.

Usage in other countries 
The Spanish equivalent of "In God We Trust", is an unofficial motto of the Republic of Nicaragua. The phrase can be seen on most of Nicaragua's coins.

Additionally, the phrase has been used in heraldic settings. In 1860, the phrase was included in the coat of arms of New Westminster, British Columbia, and it stayed there ever since. Also, until 1997, the heraldic motto of Brighton, England was the Latin equivalent of the phrase, .

See also
 In other countries:
 Deus seja louvado (Brazil)
 Dieu et mon droit (UK)
 God, Honour, Fatherland (Poland)
 "God Save the King" (UK)
 God zij met ons (Netherlands)
 Gott mit uns (Prussia, previously in Germany)
 In God We Trust: All Others Pay Cash
 List of Florida state symbols
 May God have mercy upon your soul
 National symbols of the United States
 Pledge of Allegiance of the United States, "under God" added in 1954
 Religion in the United States
 So help me God
 Trust in God and keep your powder dry

Notes

References

External links

 Final answer? Not quite as star gets second chance to play for a million – article in The Guardian about a disputed quiz question about the motto of the United States.
 Local documentary on origin of phrase

American political catchphrases
English words and phrases
1740s neologisms
1810s neologisms
National symbols of the United States
National mottos
The Star-Spangled Banner
State mottos of the United States
Symbols of Florida
Symbols of Georgia (U.S. state)
Symbols of Mississippi
Coins of the United States dollar
United States dollar banknotes
Currencies of Nicaragua
National symbols of Nicaragua
God in culture
Religion in the United States
Establishment Clause
Quotations from religion
Anti-communism in the United States
84th United States Congress
Religion and politics
History of religion in the United States